Tailson may refer to:

 Taílson (footballer, born 1975), full name José Ilson dos Santos, Brazilian football striker
 Tailson (footballer, born 1999), full name Tailson Pinto Gonçalves, Brazilian football forward